Princess Marie Alexandra of Baden (Marie Alexandra Thyra Victoria Louise Carola Hilda; 1 August 1902 – 29 January 1944) was a Hessian princess by marriage.

Family
She was the only daughter and elder child of Prince Maximilian of Baden (1867–1929) and Princess Marie Louise of Hanover and Cumberland. Her paternal grandparents were Prince Wilhelm of Baden (1829–97) and Princess Maria of Leuchtenberg (1841–1914), a daughter of Maximilian, Duke of Leuchtenberg (1817–52) and Grand Duchess Maria Nikolaevna (1819–1876).

Princess Marie-Louise of Hanover (1879–1948) was a daughter of Ernest Augustus, Crown Prince of Hanover, claimant of the annexed Kingdom of Hanover.

Marriage
On 17 September 1924, she married her fourth cousin Prince Wolfgang of Hesse (1896–1989). They had no children.

Death
Princess Marie Alexandra was killed in an attack by the U.S. Army Air Forces during an air-raid on Frankfurt am Main on 29–30 January 1944 during World War II. She and seven other women, who were aid workers, were killed when the cellar, in which they had taken refuge, collapsed under the weight of the building, rendering Marie Alexandra's body barely recognisable.

Ancestry

1902 births
1944 deaths
House of Zähringen
Finnish royalty
House of Hesse-Kassel
Princesses of Baden
Princesses of Hesse
German civilians killed in World War II
Deaths by airstrike during World War II
Deaths by American airstrikes